The Tower of San Dionisio (Spanish: Torre de San Dionisio) is a tower located in Jerez de la Frontera, Spain. It was declared Bien de Interés Cultural in 1978.

References 

Bien de Interés Cultural landmarks in the Province of Cádiz
Towers in Spain